Bagame is a settlement in Ziguinchor Department in Ziguinchor Region in the Basse Casamance area of south-west Senegal, near the border with Guinea-Bissau The population in the 2002 census was 109 people in 15 households.

Climate 
Bagame has a warm climate for relatively the entire year with the wet months occurring during the summer months and peaking in August.

Resources 
"Bagame Monthly Climate Average, Senegal." Bagame, Senegal Weather Averages. N.p., n.d. Web. 11 Dec. 2015.

"Bagame Map — Satellite Images of Bagame." Bagame Map. N.p., 2005. Web. 11 Dec. 2015.

References

External links
PEPAM

Populated places in the Ziguinchor Department